Sheep milk cheese is a cheese prepared from sheep milk. Well-known cheeses made from sheep milk include the Feta of Greece, Roquefort of France, Manchego from Spain, the Pecorino Romano and Ricotta of Italy. Yogurts, especially some forms of strained yogurt, may also be made from sheep milk.

Nutrition and production
Sheep have only two teats, and produce a far smaller volume of milk than cows. However, as sheep's milk contains far more fat, solids, and minerals than cow's milk, it is ideal for the cheese-making process. It also resists contamination during cooling better because of its much higher calcium content.  Sheep milk contains 4.8% lactose, more lactose than cow milk, and is therefore not an alternative for people who are lactose intolerant.

Though sheep's milk may be drunk in fresh form, today it is used predominantly in cheese and yogurt making.  Well-known cheeses made from sheep milk include the Feta of Bulgaria and Greece, Roquefort of France, Manchego from Spain, the Pecorino Romano (the Italian word for sheep is pecore) and Ricotta of Italy. Yogurts, especially some forms of strained yogurt, may also be made from sheep milk. Many of these products are now often made with cow's milk, especially when produced outside their country of origin. For the cheese to fully ripen takes at least two weeks; it can take between two and three months, and even up to two years.

By country

France
French sheep milk cheeses include Abbaye de Bellocq, Brique, Berger de Rocastin, Brebicet, Le Claousou, Lévejac, Valdeblore, Roquefort, Ardi-gasna, Agour, Ossau-Iraty, Brocciu, Asco, Brin d'amour, Faisselle, Fleur de Maquis, A filetta, and Niolo.

Cyprus
Cypriot sheep milk cheeses include Anari and Halloumi.

Greece
Greek sheep milk cheeses include Feta and Kefalotyri.

Italy
Italian sheep milk cheeses include Pecorino Romano,  Pecorino Sardo, Pecorino Siciliano, Pecorino Toscano and Ricotta.

Croatia 
Croatian sheep milk cheeses include Pag cheese and Ovidur.

Poland
Polish sheep milk cheeses include oscypek and bryndza.

Portugal
Portuguese sheep milk cheeses include Castelo Branco, Azeitão, Rabaçal, Saloio, Serpa and Serra.

Spain
Among the very many cheese varieties in Spain made from sheep's milk and protected by the Protected Designation of Origin (PDO) there is Roncal, made in the Roncal Valley; Idiazabal cheese, made in both Basque Country and Navarre regions from Latxa and Carranzana sheep's milk; Torta del Casar, made in Extremadura region from Merino sheep's milk; Manchego cheese, made in La Mancha region from Manchega sheep's milk.

Hungary

Hungary produces Parenyica, a sheep's milk cheese described as lightly smoked rolled cheese usually made from ewe's milk, but also from cows milk; surrounded by an edible cheese twine.

In the Northern region of Hungary another ewes milk cheese, Gomolya is made and it is allowed to ripen outside in the sun for 3 weeks while slung in cheesecloth under an open-roofed shelter. It will develop a stronger flavour when allowed to mature on wooden boards. p218.

Denmark
Danish sheep milk cheeses includes
Mønsk Mangcego and salad cheeses and white cheeses.

Ukraine
Ukrainian sheep milk cheeses includes bryndza and feta, salad cheeses and white cheeses.

See also
 List of sheep milk cheeses
 List of cheeses

References

Further reading
 . p. 123.
 . p. 798.
 . p. 176.